Barringtonia sarcostachys grows as a tree up to  tall, with a trunk diameter of up to . The bark is brown, reddish brown, grey, greenish brown or blackish. The specific epithet sarcostachys is from the Greek meaning "fleshy spike", referring to the inflorescence. Its habitat is lowland mixed dipterocarp forest from sea level to  altitude. B. sarcostachys is found in Sumatra and Borneo.

References

sarcostachys
Trees of Sumatra
Trees of Borneo
Plants described in 1851